The Ofenhorn (also known as Punta d'Arbola) is a mountain of the Lepontine Alps on the Swiss-Italian border. It is located between the valleys of Binn and Formazza.

References

External links
 Ofenhorn on Hikr

Mountains of the Alps
Alpine three-thousanders
Mountains of Switzerland
Mountains of Italy
Italy–Switzerland border
International mountains of Europe
Mountains of Valais
Lepontine Alps